Reve, Reves, Revé, or Rêve may refer to:

People
Alexis Revé (born 1972), Cuban footballer
Gerard Reve (1923–2006), Dutch writer
Emery Reves (1904–1981), Hungarian-born writer, publisher, literary agent and advocate of world federalism
Ernesto Revé (born 1992), Cuban triple jumper
Karel van het Reve (1921–1999), Dutch writer, translator and literary historian teaching and writing on Russian literature
Odalis Revé (born 1970), Cuban judoka
Thomas le Reve (died 1394), Irish bishop and Lord Chancellor of Ireland
Torger Reve (born 1949), Norwegian economist
Wendy Russell Reves (1916–2007), an American philanthropist, socialite, and former fashion model
Rêve (singer), a Canadian singer-songwriter

Miscellaneous
Rêves (album), 2009 posthumous album by Grégory Lemarchal
Revés/Yo Soy, 1999 album by Café Tacuba
Rêve: the Dream Ouroboros, French dreamlike fantasy role-playing game created by Denis Gerfaud and edited in English by Malcontent Games
Reve's puzzle, optimal solution of the Tower of Hanoi, a mathematical game or puzzle
Reo (deity), sometimes rendered as Reve in Latin inscriptions, a Lusitanian-Gallaecian deity

See also
Le Rêve (disambiguation), title of several cultural works
Reeve, the surname of many people
Reeves, the surname of many people